John Clerke was an English politician.

John Clerke may also refer to:

John Clerke (died 1528), MP for Norwich
John Clerke (MP for Bath), MP for Bath
John Clarke (physician, 1582–1653), English physician. His last name was also spelt Clerke.

See also
John Clerk (disambiguation)
John Clarke (disambiguation)
John Clark (disambiguation)